The Norwegian Women's Handball Cup, is the main domestic cup tournament for Norwegian women's handball clubs, which is organised and supervised by the Norwegian Handball Federation. The competition has been played annually since 1946. Larvik HK is its most successful team with 17 titles. Between 1939 and 1974 there was also an outdoor competition besides indoor.

Since the 2022/23 edition the semifinals and finals are being played in a Final 8 format, where both men's and women's final 4 teams play during the same weekend in the same arena.

Finals

Outdoors

Indoors
Note that the year the title counts for has been changing during the years, sometimes being by what year the cup started and sometimes by season.

References

Handball competitions in Norway
Recurring sporting events established in 1958